Marian W. Hanson (born January 17, 1933) is an American politician in the state of Montana who served in the Montana House of Representatives from 1996 to 2004. She served from 1993 to 1997 as Speaker pro tempore of the House. A resident of Ashland, Montana, she is a rancher. She graduated from Custer County High School in 1951.

References

1933 births
Living people
People from Santa Maria, California
People from Rosebud County, Montana
Ranchers from Montana
Women state legislators in Montana
Republican Party members of the Montana House of Representatives
21st-century American women